Kukri Mukri is an island (char) of Char Kukri Mukri union, Bhola District, in southern Bangladesh. It is the southernmost part of the district. The land is low-lying, and at high tide extensive portions are under water. Much of the shore is mud flats. The Char Kukri-Mukri Wildlife Sanctuary lies on the island.

References

Islands of Bangladesh
Bhola District
Uninhabited islands of Bangladesh